Former Residence of Yang Yong or Yang Yong's Former Residence was built in the late Qing Dynasty in 1873, it is located in Wenjiashi Town of Liuyang, Hunan, China.

History
In 1913, Yang Yong was born in here.

In 2004, it was listed as a "Major Historical and Cultural Site Protected at the County Level".

In 2011, it was listed as a "Historical and Cultural Sites Protected at the Provincial Level".

Gallery

References

Buildings and structures in Liuyang
Tourist attractions in Changsha
Traditional folk houses in Hunan